Clifford Anderson (March 23, 1833 – December 19, 1899) was a prominent Georgia politician, active in the politics of the state of Georgia and the Confederate States of America during its existence.

Biography
Anderson was born in Nottoway County, Virginia. He read law and was admitted to the bar in 1852, forming a partnership with Robert S. Lanier.

He married Anne LeConte in 1857, and they had two children.

He served as a state court Judge in Georgia from 1856 to 1858, and in the Georgia House of Representatives in 1859. He served in the Confederate States Army and represented Georgia in the Second Confederate Congress from 1864 to 1865. After the war, he served as Georgia's Attorney General from 1880 to 1890.

He died at his home in Macon on December 19, 1899.

References

External links

1833 births
1899 deaths
Members of the Confederate House of Representatives from Georgia (U.S. state)
19th-century American politicians
Confederate States Army officers
Members of the Georgia House of Representatives
People from Nottoway County, Virginia